Govurqala may refer to:

 Govurqala, Ağdam
 Govurqala, Shaki 
 Govurqala, Oguz
 Govurqala, Nakhchivan